The 2009 Warsaw Open was a women's tennis tournament played on outdoor clay courts. It was the 13th edition of the Warsaw Open, part of the Premier-level tournaments of the 2009 WTA Tour. It took place at the Legia Tennis Centre in Warsaw, Poland, from 18 May until 23 May 2009. Unseeded Alexandra Dulgheru, who entered the main draw as a qualifier, won the singles title.

Entrants

Seeds

 Seedings are based on the rankings of May 11, 2009.
 Agnieszka Radwańska withdrew due to a back injury, so Tsvetana Pironkova became the No. 9 seed.

Other entrants
The following players received wildcards into the main draw:

  Daniela Hantuchová
  Maria Sharapova
  Katarzyna Piter

The following players received entry from the qualifying draw:

  Ioana Raluca Olaru
  Ágnes Szatmári
  Alexandra Dulgheru
  Gréta Arn

The following players received entry as lucky losers:

  Darya Kustova
  Lenka Tvarošková

Finals

Singles

 Alexandra Dulgheru defeated  Alona Bondarenko, 7–6(3), 3–6, 6–0
It was Dulgheru's first career title.

Doubles

 Raquel Kops-Jones /  Bethanie Mattek-Sands defeated   Yan Zi /   Zheng Jie, 6–1, 6–1

External links
 Official website
 Singles, Doubles and Qualifying Singles Draws

Warsaw Open
Warsaw Open
War